The Patrologia Graeca (or Patrologiae Cursus Completus, Series Graeca) is an edited collection of writings by the Christian Church Fathers and various secular writers, in the Greek language. It consists of 161 volumes produced in 1857–1866 by J. P. Migne's Imprimerie Catholique, Paris.

Description 
The Patrologia Graeca is an edited collection of writings by the Christian Church Fathers and various secular writers, in the Greek language. It consists of 161 volumes produced in 1857–1866 by J. P. Migne's Imprimerie Catholique, Paris. It includes both the Eastern Fathers and those Western authors who wrote before Latin became predominant in the Western Church in the 3rd century, e.g. the early writings collectively known as the Apostolic Fathers, such as the First and Second Epistle of Clement, the Shepherd of Hermas, Eusebius, Origen, and the Cappadocian Fathers Basil the Great, Gregory of Nazianzus, and Gregory of Nyssa.

The 161 volumes are bound as 166 (vols. 16 and 87 being in three parts and vol. 86 in two). An important final volume, which included some supplements and a full index, was never published, as the plates were destroyed in a fire (1868) at the printer.

The first series contained only Latin translations of the originals (81 vols., 1856-61). The second series contains the Greek text with a Latin translation (166 vols., 1857-66). The texts are interlaced, with one column of Greek and a corresponding column on the other side of the page that is the Latin translation. Where the Greek original has been lost, as in the case of Irenaeus, the extant Greek fragments are interspersed throughout the Latin text. In one instance, the original is preserved in Syriac only and translated into Latin. Quite often, information about the author is provided, also in Latin.

A Greek, D. Scholarios, added a half-published list of the authors and subjects, (Athens, 1879) and began a complete table of contents (Athens, 1883). In 1912, Garnier Frères, Paris, published a Patrologia Graeca index volume, edited by Ferdinand Cavallera.

List of volumes
As with the Patrologia Latina, the authors are (with a few exceptions) in chronological order, spanning the period from the earliest Christian writers to the Fall of Constantinople.

Pre-Nicaean

4th century

5th century

6th century

7th century

8th century

9th century

10th century

11th century

12th century

13th century

14th century

15th century

Republication
A new edition has been prepared by the Centre for Patristic Studies, Athens (Κέντρο Πατερικών Εκδόσεων). It comprises additional supplements: introductions, bibliographies, biographical summaries, detailed tables of contents and hagiographic passages.

See also
 Patrologia Latina – writings in Latin (221 volumes).
 Patrologia Orientalis, which includes writings by Greek and eastern Church Fathers composed or transmitted in Syriac, Coptic, Armenian, Ethiopic, Georgian, Old Church Slavonic and Arabic. It was begun after Migne's death.

References

Citations

Sources

External links 
Searching Migne's Patrologia Graeca texts
 Dorotheos Scholarios Index of Migne's Patrologia Graeca texts
 Complete catalog of downloadable PDFs of PG volumes – organized by volume (Google Books)
 Catalog of PG volumes in Google Books and elsewhere, by Mischa Hooker
 Ancient Greek OCR of PG at the Lace repository of Mount Allison University: vol. 45, vol. 46
 Patrologia Graeca (PG) PDF's at Roger Pearse

Publications of patristic texts
Dual-language series of texts
Editorial collections
Lists of books
1850s books
1860s books
19th-century Latin books
Middle Ages Christian texts
Medieval Greek
Texts in Koine Greek
Series of books
Translations into Latin